2 Boötis is a single star in the northern constellation of Boötes, located 337 light years away from the Sun. It is visible to the naked eye as a faint, yellow-hued star with an apparent visual magnitude of 5.63. This object is moving further from the Earth with a heliocentric radial velocity of +4 km/s.

At the age of 1.33 billion years old, this is an evolved giant star with a stellar classification of K0 III, having exhausted the hydrogen at its core and expanded off the main sequence. It has 1.9 times the mass of the Sun with ten times the Sun's radius. The star is radiating 60 times the luminosity of the Sun from its enlarged photosphere at an effective temperature of 4,867 K.

References

K-type giants
Boötes
Durchmusterung objects
Bootis, 02
119126
066763
5149